Dorothy Cisley de la Hey (6 February 1884 - ?) was one of the pioneers in women's education in India. She was the founder of Queen Mary's College in Madras, Madras Presidency in British India in 1914. It is the third oldest women's college in India.
She was 30 years old when she came to Madras to visit her brother, Clement de la Hey, Vice Principal of Newington College in Madras. She became the head of the college after consultation with then Governor of Madras Presidency Lord Pentland. It was called Madras College for Women, and was later renamed Queen Mary's College in 1917. Dorothy de la Hey had earned a master's degree in History from Oxford and did teacher training in the St. Mary's College, Paddington. She was the Principal until 1936, when she retired, and also taught in the college.

References

1884 births
Year of death missing
Founders of Indian schools and colleges
British people in colonial India